Leif Flengsrud (18 September 1922 – 24 August 2009) was a Norwegian cyclist.

He was born in Vang, Hedmark and represented the club Hamar IL. He participated in the 1948 Summer Olympics but did not finish the road race. He was the first Olympic cyclist from his region. He also competed in the World Championships in the same year.

His father Olaf and brother Oddvar were cyclists as well. His father had opened a bike shop in 1920, and Flengsrud later spent his working life in this shop. He also continued as a hobby sportsman well into his seventies and eighties. He died in August 2009 in Hamar.

Results

References

1922 births
2009 deaths
Sportspeople from Hamar
Norwegian male cyclists
Cyclists at the 1948 Summer Olympics
Olympic cyclists of Norway